In complex analysis, a complex-valued function  of a complex variable :

 is said to be analytic at  if in some open disk centered at  it can be expanded as a convergent power series  (this implies that the radius of convergence is positive).

One of the most important theorems of complex analysis is that holomorphic functions are analytic and vice versa.  Among the corollaries of this theorem are

 the identity theorem that two holomorphic functions that agree at every point of an infinite set  with an accumulation point inside the intersection of their domains also agree everywhere in every connected open subset of their domains that contains the set , and
 the fact that, since power series are infinitely differentiable, so are holomorphic functions (this is in contrast to the case of real differentiable functions), and
 the fact that the radius of convergence is always the distance from the center  to the nearest non-removable singularity; if there are no singularities (i.e., if  is an entire function), then the radius of convergence is infinite.  Strictly speaking, this is not a corollary of the theorem but rather a by-product of the proof.
 no bump function on the complex plane can be entire.  In particular, on any connected open subset of the complex plane, there can be no bump function defined on that set which is holomorphic on the set.  This has important ramifications for the study of complex manifolds, as it precludes the use of partitions of unity.  In contrast the partition of unity is a tool which can be used on any real manifold.

Proof 

The argument, first given by Cauchy, hinges on Cauchy's integral formula and the power series expansion of the expression

 

Starting with Cauchy's integral formula, we have

 

 

for some positive  as well.  We therefore have

 

As the factor  does not depend on the variable of integration , it may be factored out to yield

 

which has the desired form of a power series in :

 

with coefficients

Remarks 
 Since power series can be differentiated term-wise, applying the above argument in the reverse direction and the power series expression for  gives  This is a Cauchy integral formula for derivatives.
 A special case of the identity theorem follows from the preceding remark.

External links 
 

holomorphic functions
Theorems in complex analysis
Article proofs